I've Sound is a team of Japanese music producers based in Hokkaido. Their discography comprises twelve compilation albums (eight for the main Girls Compilation series, three for the Short Circuit series, and two for the Mania Tracks series), one EP, four remix albums, one remix single, four music video DVDs, three concert DVDs, a making-of DVD, and a movie DVD. This does not take into account the individual works by their vocalists and related musical acts, for whom they have produced numerous albums and singles.

The Girls Compilation albums are compilations of their song contributions for PC games and the like. These albums usually include a newly recorded song or two, with one often named after the album. The Short Circuit compilations are a series of concept albums that focuses on denpa music, a genre of music that typically features hyper, energetic music, nonsensical lyrics, cutesy vocals, and kakegoe. They mainly feature the vocals of Kotoko and Kaori Utatsuki. Whereas the Mania Tracks albums compiles songs whose original sound source, due to circumstances, they were unable to include in the main Girls Compilation, and rare tracks. The C-lick single and Mixed Up and The Front Line Covers albums feature remixes of their older works, covered by different artists in general. The Master Groove Circle albums feature trance remixes of their songs, produced in collaboration with a group of other remixers.

Their independent releases are manufactured by Factory Records and distributed by Visual Art's, 
while their major releases fall under Geneon Universal Entertainment (formerly known as Geneon Entertainment).

Albums

Girls Compilation series

Short Circuit series

Comic Market releases

Other albums

Singles

Comic Market releases

Other singles

Videos

See also
Kotoko discography
Mami Kawada discography
Eiko Shimamiya discography
Mell discography
Kaori Utatsuki discography
C.G mix discography
Love Planet Five discography

References

Discographies of Japanese artists
Pop music group discographies